Jetsada Puanakunmee (born February 15, 1982) is a Thai retired professional footballer who played as a midfielder.

International career

External links
 Profile at Goal

1982 births
Living people
Jetsada Puanakunmee
Jetsada Puanakunmee
Association football midfielders
Jetsada Puanakunmee
Jetsada Puanakunmee
Jetsada Puanakunmee